Hasan Rustamov (born 12 February 1988) is a Tajikistani footballer who last played for FK Khujand and the Tajikistan national football team.

Career
On 20 January 2019, FK Khujand announced Rustamov had left the club after his contract had expired.

Career statistics

International

Statistics accurate as of match played 12 November 2015

Honors
Regar-TadAZ
 Tajik Cup (2): 2011, 2012

References

1987 births
Living people
Tajikistani footballers
Tajikistan international footballers
Regar-TadAZ Tursunzoda players
FK Khujand players
Vakhsh Qurghonteppa players
Tajikistan Higher League players
Association football defenders